The R444 road is a regional road in Ireland linking R357 at Shannonbridge, County Offaly with the R446 at Farnagh three kilometers west of Moate in  County Westmeath.

See also
Roads in Ireland
National primary road
National secondary road

References
Roads Act 1993 (Classification of Regional Roads) Order 2006 – Department of Transport

Regional roads in the Republic of Ireland
Roads in County Offaly
Roads in County Westmeath